Ebulobo is a stratovolcano located in the south-central part of the island of Flores, Indonesia.

See also
List of volcanoes in Indonesia

References

Ebulobo
Ebulobo
Ebulobo
Ebulobo
Holocene stratovolcanoes